Guglielmo Acton (25 March 1825, in Castellammare di Stabia – 29 November 1896, in Naples) was an Italian naval officer, admiral and politician in the Kingdom of the Two Sicilies and then Minister for the Navy in the unified Kingdom of Italy (1870–1871).

Serving in the Real Marina and Regia Marina, he was descended from a noble family which had originated in England before moving to Tuscany then the Kingdom of the Two Sicilies.

His grandfather was General Joseph Edward Acton (1737–1830), brother of Sir John Acton, 6th Baronet, commander of the naval forces of Grand Duchy of Tuscany and prime minister of Naples. His elder brother was Ferdinando Acton and his nephew was Alfredo Acton, also Minister for the Navy. His sister Laura remarried in 1864 with Marco Minghetti, then prime minister of Italy.

Naval officers of the Kingdom of the Two Sicilies
People from Castellammare di Stabia
Italian people of English descent
1825 births
1896 deaths
Members of the Expedition of the Thousand
Italian admirals